Kevin Allan Hunt (3 December 1933 – 15 September 2016) was an Australian rules footballer who played with Carlton in the Victorian Football League (VFL).

Notes

External links 

Kevin Hunt's profile at Blueseum

1933 births
Carlton Football Club players
Australian rules footballers from Victoria (Australia)
2016 deaths